Teotleco  is the name of the twelfth month of the Aztec calendar. It is also a festival  in the Aztec religion and is known as the festival of All gods where all gods are worshiped.

References

Aztec calendars
Aztec mythology and religion